Desquamative gingivitis is an erythematous (red), desquamatous (shedding) and ulcerated appearance of the gums. It is a descriptive term and can be caused by several different disorders.

Signs and symptoms
Desquamative gingivitis involves lesions of the free and attached gingiva. Unlike plaque-induced inflammation of the gums (normal marginal gingivitis), desquamative gingivitis extends beyond the marginal gingiva, involving the full width of the gingiva and sometimes the alveolar mucosa. The term "full width gingivitis" usually refers to the oral lesions of orofacial granulomatosis however. The color is another dissimilarity between typical marginal gingivitis and desquamative gingivitis, in the latter it is dusky red. Plasma cell gingivitis is another form of gingivitis which affects both the attached and free gingiva.

Cause
Caused by various autoimmune diseases as well as allergies. Erosive lichen planus, mucous membrane pemphigoid, pemphigus vulgaris, erythema exsudativum multiforme and lupus erythematosus.

Diagnosis

Differential diagnosis
Desquamative gingivitis is a descriptive clinical term, not a diagnosis. Dermatologic conditions cause about 75% of cases of desquamative gingivitis, and over 95% of the dermatologic cases are accounted for by  either oral lichen planus or cicatricial pemphigoid. The exact cause of desquamative gingivitis cannot be determined about a third of cases.

 Oral lichen planus
 Cicatricial pemphigoid or less commonly bullous pemphigoid
 Pemphigus vulgaris
 Linear immunoglobulin A disease
 Dermatitis herpetiformis
 Lupus erythematosus
 Chronic ulcerative stomatitis
 Chronic bacterial, fungal, and viral infections
 Reactions to medications, mouthwashes, and chewing gum

Rare causes include:
 Crohn’s disease
 Sarcoidosis
 Leukemia
 factitious (self inflicted) lesions
 Squamous cell carcinoma (can be mistaken for desquamative gingivitis)

Treatment
 Improving oral hygiene
 Minimising irritation of the lesions
 Specific therapies for the underlying disease (where available)
 Local or systemic immunosuppressive or dapsone therapy (notably not corticosteroids)

History
This condition was first recognized and reported in 1894, but the term desquamative gingivitis was not coined until 1932.

References

External links 

Conditions of the mucous membranes
Periodontal disorders